Guido Gorgatti (born 5 December 1919) is an Italian-born Argentine film actor. He emigrated to Argentina when he was 10 years old.

He appeared in more than 20 movies since his debut.

Filmography

Film

References

Bibliography 
 Peter Cowie & Derek Elley. World Filmography: 1967. Fairleigh Dickinson University Press, 1977.

External links 

 

1919 births
Living people
Italian centenarians
Argentine centenarians
Argentine male film actors
Italian male film actors
Italian emigrants to Argentina
People from Rovigo
Men centenarians